Henoc Beauséjour (born November 18, 1973), known by his stage name Roi Heenok, is a Canadian rapper, producer and entrepreneur of Haitian descent from Montreal, Quebec.

Roi Heenok has achieved notoriety in France and the French rap market since 2004 as a result of his successful use of Internet marketing. An avant-gardist who always commands his crowd, Roi Heenok was the first viral video star at a time when YouTube & DailyMotion were only starting to be used as branding tools. Considered a legend in the French rap world, Roi Heenok is known for his unique and authentic style of Queens Bridge French rap. Roi Heenok has worked with legendary artist Raekwon from the Wu-Tang Clan, G.O.D Pt.3 from Infamous Mobb, Green Money, Alibi Montana & Le Gued Muss. His music has appeared on the album Capitale du Crime 2 of Sony artist La Fouine.

Roi Heenok has released three mixtapes: 'Propagande Américaine : La Dose ((Warner distribution), Europe & Quebecor distribution, Canada) in 2005, Cocaino Rap Musique Vol.1 (Sony distribution) in 2007 & Cocaino Rap Musique Vol.2 (Believe distribution), France in 2009. He released his first Independent album under his label Gangster & Gentleman Inc. on 12/12/12, entitled Noirs et Professionnels exclusively on iTunes.

Roi Heenok has starred in three movie projects: Les Mathématiques du Roi Heenok directed by Mohammed Mazouz & Romain Gavras, 'Le Monde Selon Roi Heenok' & 'Le Retour à Queens Bridge' directed by Amine Bouziane, Julien Lafond & Henoc Beauséjour.

Roi Heenok founded his first clothing line Ghetto Elegance in 2008

Early life and career
Henoc Beauséjour emigrated to the United States at age two. After moving several times throughout the world, his family finally settled in Montreal, Quebec.

In 1989, Roi Heenok moved to Queens, New York to further craft his early love for hip hop culture and DJing. He later opened his first label Drama Stay Life Entertainment, signing and producing local artists such as Iman Thug, Bam Gotti, Rudy Red. In 1999, Roi Heenok returned to Montreal to open his recording studio. In 2003 he opened his current label Gangster & Gentleman Records Inc. signing and producing local artists Rap Iso, Kinimod, UgoBoss and Lynn (first female R&B singer).

In 2005, Roi Heenok made his first appearance on MTVFrance during his highly anticipated arrival in Paris. He went on to later work on movie projects including Kourtrajmé's January 2008 release of Les Mathématiques du Roi Heenok, the first DVD project ever directed by Mohamed Mazouz & Romain Gavras (who has done videos for the likes of Jay-Z, Kanye West & MIA).

Personal life

On April 17, 2008, Henoc Beauséjour was arrested at his Montreal recording studio stemming from the content of the 2008 DVD 'Les Mathématiques du Roi'. 
Henoc Beauséjour was 'acquitted' of all charges in 2013.

Discography
 Propagande Américaine : La Dose, La Mixtape(2005)
 Cocaïno Rap Musique Vol.1: le CD mixé Styles Libres Exclusifs Volume 1 (2007)
 Cocaïno Rap Musique Vol.1 le DVD et CD mixé Styles Libres Exclusifs Édition Limitée(2008)
 Cocaïno Rap Musique Volume 2 : Édition Finale(2009)
 Noirs et Professionnels, (12/12/12)

Filmography
 Les Mathématiques du Roi Heenok, DVD Kourtrajmé, (January 2008)
 Cocaïno Rap Musique le DVD, Stuff Productions (June 2008)
 Le Monde selon Roi Heenok, DVD Stuff Productions(February 2011)
 Le Retour à Queens Bridge, web-series, G&G Films & Stuff Productions, (September 2012)

References

External links
 Gangster et Gentlemen, Heenok's musical group
 Roi Heenok's official website
 an interview
 Roi Heenok's clothing line
 Roi Heenok on dailymotion

1973 births
Living people
Black Canadian musicians
Canadian male rappers
Canadian people of Haitian descent
Haitian Quebecers
Musicians from Montreal
21st-century Canadian rappers
21st-century Canadian male musicians